Louis Bisson,  was a Canadian aviator. He was born in 1909 in Hull, Quebec (now Gatineau, Quebec). He died on 19 September 1997.

He flew for the Royal Air Force Ferry Command during World War II.

Louis Bisson received the King's Commendation for Valuable Service in the Air on 11 June 1942. He was appointed an Officer of the Order of the British Empire on 1 January 1944. He was appointed a Member of the Order of Canada on 23 June 1980. He was inducted in the Québec Air and Space Hall of Fame on 21 October 2002.

The Louis Bisson Bridge over the Rivière des Prairies is named after him.

References

External links
God's co-pilot: Captain Louis Bisson logged 10,000 air miles in 138 Atlantic crossings with Ferry Command and years later became a bishop.

Canadian World War II pilots
1909 births
1997 deaths
Royal Air Force airmen
Members of the Order of Canada
Canadian Officers of the Order of the British Empire
People from Gatineau
Recipients of the Commendation for Valuable Service in the Air
Royal Air Force pilots of World War II